Porellales is an order of liverworts.

Taxonomy
 Jubulineae Müller 1909
 Frullaniaceae Lorch 1914
 Frullania Raddi 1818a [Amphijubula Schuster 1970a; Schusterella Hattori, Sharp & Mizutani 1972; Steerea Hattori & Kamimura 1971; Mylia Leman 1825 non Gray 1821]
 Jubulaceae von Klinggräff 1858
 Jubula Dumortier 1822 nom. cons. non Bates 1929 [Salviatus Gray 1821]
 Neohattoria Kamimura 1962 [Hattoria Kamimura 1961 non Schuster 1961]
 Nipponolejeunea Hattori 1944d
 Lejeuneaceae Cavers 1910 [Metzgeriopsaceae]
 Lejeuneoideae 
 Brachiolejeuneeae
 Brachiolejeuneinae Gradstein
 Acanthocoleus Schuster 1970b
 Blepharolejeunea Arnell 1962b
 Brachiolejeunea (Spruce 1884) Schiffner 1893b [Lejeunea (Brachiolejeunea) Spruce 1884]
 Dicranolejeunea (Spruce 1884) Schiffner 1893b [Lejeunea (Dicranolejeunea) Spruce 1884; Dicrojeunea Kuntze 1903]
 Lindigianthus Kruijt & Gradstein 1985 
 Odontolejeunea (Spruce 1884) Schiffner 1893b [Lejeunea (Odontolejeunea) Spruce 1884; Dentijeunea Kuntze 1903]
 Stictolejeuneinae Gradstein
 Neurolejeunea (Spruce 1884) Schiffner 1893b [Lejeunea (Neurolejeunea) Spruce 1884]
 Stictolejeunea (Spruce 1884) Schiffner 1893b [Lejeunea (Stictolejeunea) Spruce 1884; Leptostictolejeunea (Schuster 1984) Schuster 1990]
 Lejeuneeae
 Dactylophorella Schuster 1980
 Metalejeunea Grolle 1995
 Pictolejeunea Grolle 1977
 Ceratolejeuneinae Gradstein
 Ceratolejeunea (Spruce 1884) Jack & Stephani 1892 [Lejeunea (Ceratolejeunea) Spruce 1884; Cornijeunea Kuntze 1903]
 Luteolejeunea Piippo 1986
 Otigoniolejeunea (Spruce 1884) Schiffner 1893b [Lejeunea (Otigoniolejeunea) Spruce 1884; Ectojeunea Kuntze 1903; Physantholejeunea Schuster 1978]
 Cheilolejeuneinae Gradstein
 Aureolejeunea R.M.Schust.
 Cheilolejeunea (Spruce 1884) Stephani 1890c [Lejeunea (Cheilolejeunea) Spruce 1884; Aureolejeunea Schuster 1978; Omphalanthus Lindenberg & Nees 1845; Omphalolejeunea (Spruce 1884) Lacouture 1908; Lejeunea (Omphalolejeunea) Spruce 1884; Peltolejeunea (Spruce 1884) Schiffner 1893; Lejeunea (Peltolejeunea) Spruce 1884; Osmojeunea Kuntze 1903; Strepsilejeunea (Spruce 1884) Schiffner 1893; Lejeunea (Strepsilejeunea) Spruce 1884; Anomalolejeunea (Spruce 1887) Schiffner 1893; Lejeunea (Anomalolejeunea) Spruce 1887; Notholejeunea Kuntze 1903; Leucolejeunea Evans 1907; Trachylejeunea (Spruce 1884) Schiffner 1893 nom. cons.; Potamolejeunea (Spruce 1884) Lacouture 1908]
 Cyrtolejeunea Evans 1903c
 Cystolejeunea Evans 1906a
 Omphalanthus Lindenb. & Nees
 Cololejeuneinae Gradstein
 Aphanotropis Herzog 1952
 Calatholejeunea Goebel 1928
 Cololejeunea (Spruce 1884) Stephani 1891a [Lejeunea (Cololejeunea) Spruce 1884; Aphanolejeunea Evansand 1911; Metzgeriopsis Goebel 1888; Boninoleptocolea Horikawa 1936; Jovetastella Tixier 1974; Taeniolejeunea Zwickel 1933; Leptocolea (Spruce 1884) Evans 1911; Pedinolejeunea (Benedix ex Mizutani 1961) Chen & Wu 1964; Cololejeunea (Physocolea) Spruce 1884; Physocolea (Spruce 1884) Stephani 1916; Chondriolejeunea (Benedix 1953) Kis & Pócs]
 Colura (Dumortier 1831) Dumortier 1835 [Lejeunea section Colura Du¬mortier 1831; Myriocolea Spruce 1884; Colurolejeunea Schiffner 1893; Lejeunea (Colurolejeunea) Spruce 1884; Mitrojeunea Kuntze 1903]
 Diplasiolejeunea (Spruce 1884) Schiffner 1893 [Lejeunea (Diplasiolejeunea) Spruce 1884; Dijeunea Kuntze 1903]
 Haplolejeunea Grolle 1975
 Macrocolura Schuster 1994 
 Myriocoleopsis Schiffner 1944
 Nephelolejeunea Grolle 1973 [Austrolejeunea (Schuster 1963) Schuster 1963; Siphonolejeunea (Austrolejeunea) Schuster 1963] 
 Schusterolejeunea Grolle 1980 [Cladocolea Schuster 1963a non Van Tieghem 1895]
 Siphonolejeunea Herzog 1942
 Tuyamaella Hattori 1951
 Cyclolejeuneinae Gradstein
 Bromeliophila Schuster 1994
 Cyclolejeunea Evans 1904
 Prionolejeunea (Spruce 1884) Schiffner 1893 [Lejeunea (Prionolejeunea) Spruce 1884; Serrijeunea Kuntze 1903]
 Drepanolejeuneinae Gradstein
 Capillolejeunea Arnell 1965
 Drepanolejeunea (Spruce 1884) Schiffner 1891 [Lejeunea (Drepanolejeunea) Spruce 1884; Rhaphidolejeunea Herzog 1943c; Falcijeunea Kuntze 1903]
 Vitalianthus Schuster & Giancotti 1993
 Echinolejeuneinae Gradstein
 Anoplolejeunea (Spruce 1884) Schiffner 1893 [Lejeunea (Anoplolejeunea) Spruce 1884; Anolejeunea Kuntze 1903]
 Echinolejeunea Schuster 1963
 Kymatolejeunea Grolle 1984
 Leiolejeuneinae Schäfer-Verwimp & Heinrichs
 Leiolejeunea Evans 1908
 Lejeuneinae Gradstein
 Harpalejeunea (Spruce 1884) Schiffner 1893 [Lejeunea (Harpalejeunea) Spruce 1884]
 Hattoriolejeunea Mizutani 1986
 Lejeunea Libert 1820 nom. cons. [Amblyolejeunea Jovet Ast 1949; Amphilejeunea Schuster 1978; Crossotolejeunea (Spruce 1884) Schiffner 1893; Lejeunea (Crossotolejeunea) Spruce 1884; Crossojeunea Post & Kuntze 1903; Cryptogynolejeunea Schuster; Dactylolejeunea Schuster 1971; Dicladolejeunea Schuster; Echinocolea Schuster 1963; Macrolejeunea (Spruce 1884) Schiffner 1893; Lejeunea (Macrolejeunea) Spruce 1884; Neopotamolejeunea Reiner; Eulejeunea Schiffner 1893; Hygrolejeunea (Spruce 1884) Schiffner 1893; Lejeunea (Hygrolejeunea) Spruce 1884; Taxilejeunea (Spruce 1884) Schiffner 1893 ; Stylolejeunea Sim 1926; Byssolejeunea Herzog 1941;  Heterolejeunea Schiffner 1941; Cladolejeunea Zwickel 1933; Sphaerolejeunea Herzog 1938; Nesolejeunea Herzog 1947]
 Microlejeunea (Spruce 1884) Stephani 1888a [Lejeunea (Microlejeunea) Spruce 1884]
 Taxilejeunea (Spruce 1884) Stephani 1889c nom. cons. [Lejeunea (Taxilejeunea) Spruce 1884;Evansiolejeunea Vanden Berghen 1949; Schusteria Kachroo 1957]
 Lepidolejeuneinae Gradstein
 Lepidolejeunea Schuster 1963
 Otolejeunea Grolle & Tixier 1980
 Rectolejeunea Evans 1906
 Leptolejeuneinae Heinrichs & Schäfer-Verwimp
 Leptolejeunea (Spruce 1884) Stephani 1891c [Lejeunea (Leptolejeunea) Spruce 1884] 
 Pycnolejeuneinae Heinrichs & Schäfer-Verwimp
 Pycnolejeunea (Spruce 1884) Schiffner 1893 [Lejeunea (Pycnolejeunea) Spruce 1884] 
 Xylolejeuneinae Henrichs & Schäfer-Verwimp
 Xylolejeunea He & Grolle 2001
 Symbiezidieae Gradstein
 Symbiezidium Trevisan 1877
 Ptychanthoideae Mizut.
 Acrolejeunea (Spruce 1884) Schiffner 1893 nom. cons. [Lejeunea (Acrolejeunea) Spruce 1884; Acrolejeunea Stephani 1890  suppressed name; Trocholejeunea Schiffner 1932]
 Archilejeunea (Spruce 1884) Schiffner 1893 [Lejeunea (Archilejeunea) Spruce 1884]
 Bryopteris (Nees 1838b) Lindenberg 1845a [Frullania (Bryopteris) Nees 1838b; Bryolejeunea (Spruce1884) Lacouture 1908; Lejeunea (Bryolejeunea) Spruce1884]
 Caudalejeunea (Stephani 1890) Schiffner 1893 [Lejeunea (Caudalejeunea) Stephani 1890]
 Cephalantholejeunea Schuster 1980 
 Cephalolejeunea Mizutani 1979
 Frullanoides Raddi 1822 [Ptychocoleus Trevisan 1877]
 Fulfordianthus Gradstein 1992a
 Lopholejeunea (Spruce 1884) Stephani 1890c nom. cons. [Lejeunea (Lopholejeunea) Spruce 1884; Lopholejeunea Stephani 1890  suppressed name]
 Marchesinia Gray 1821 nom. cons. [Homalolejeunea (Spruce 1884) Lacouture 1908; Lejeunea (Homalolejeunea) Spruce 1884; Phragmicoma Dumortier 1822]
 Mastigolejeunea (Spruce 1884) Stephani 1891a [Lejeunea (Mastigolejeunea) Spruce 1884; Flagrijeunea Kuntze 1903]
 Phaeolejeunea Mizutani 1968
 Ptychanthus Nees 1838 [Ptycholejeunea (Spruce1884) Stephani 1895; Lejeunea (Ptycholejeunea) Spruce 1884]
 Schiffneriolejeunea Verdoorn 1933a
 Spruceanthus Verdoorn 1934
 Thysananthus Lindenberg 1844 [Thysanolejeunea (Spruce 1884) Stephani 1896; Lejeunea (Thysanolejeunea) Spruce 1884]
 Tuzibeanthus Hattori 1947 
 Verdoornianthus Gradstein 1977
 Porellineae Schuster 1963
 Goebeliellaceae Verdoorn 1932
 Goebeliella Stephani 1911
 Lepidolaenaceae Nakai 1943 [Jubulopsaceae]
 Gackstroemia Trevisan 1877
 Lepidogyna Schuster 1980
 Lepidolaena Dumortier 1835 [Jubulopsis Schuster 1970; Polyotus Gottsche 1845a nom. illeg. non Nuttall 1837]
 Porellaceae Cavers 1910 nom. cons.
 Ascidiota Massalongo 1898
 Porella Linnaeus 1753 [Macvicaria Nicholson 1930 non Gibson & Bray 1982; Opeca Hill 1773; Antoiria Raddi 1818; Cavendishia Gray 1821  suppressed name non Lindley 1835 nom. cons.; Madotheca Dumortier 1822; Suaresia Leman 1827; Schulthesia Raddi 1822]
 Radulineae Schuster 1963
 Radulaceae Müller 1909
 Radula Dumortier 1822 nom. cons. [Martinellius Gray 1821; Candollea Raddi 1818 non Mirbel 1802; Stephanina Kuntze 1891; Patarola Trevisan 1877 non Leman 1825]

References 

 
Liverwort orders